Evander G. "Pete" MacRae (January 22, 1902 – March 1965) was an American football and basketball player. He first gained note as a football player for the undefeated 1919 Allegheny High School football team from Pittsburgh, Pennsylvania. He then enrolled at Syracuse University where played both football and basketball.  He played at the end position for the Syracuse Orange football team and was a consensus first-team All-American in 1923.  He also played for three years from 1921 to 1924 on the Syracuse Orange men's basketball team. After graduating from Syracuse, he played professional basketball with the Syracuse All Stars.

References

1902 births
1965 deaths
All-American college football players
American football ends
Syracuse Orange football players
Players of American football from Pittsburgh
Basketball players from Pittsburgh